The Chilean Chess Championship is the national chess championship of Chile organised by the FENACH (Federacion Nacional de Ajedrez de Chile).  In 2004–2006 there was also a championship organised by the FEDAC (Federación Deportiva de Ajedrez de Chile).

Winners

The winners of the FEDACH competition were Luis Rojas Keim (2004) and Mauricio Flores Ríos (2005, 2006).

References

External links
 Results from the Federacion Nacional de Ajedrez de Chile 
 Federación Nacional de Ajedrez de Chile
 Fundacion Chilena de Ajedrez
 Liga Nacional de Ajedrecistas de Chile

Chess national championships
Championship
Chilean culture